also known as Doraemon the Movie 2002 is a 2002 Japanese animated science fantasy film which premiered in Japan on March 9, 2002, based on the 22nd volume of the same name of the Doraemon Long Stories series. It's the 23rd Doraemon film.

Plot 

Doraemon and his friends meet a strange robot boy from a futuristic ordering machine. Through a difficult time space maze (possibly a deep hole), they finally reach the boy's planet, but many treasures fall. The party goes to Dr. Capek's house and learns about Queen Jane's "Robot Reproduction Plan" to eliminate the robot's emotions stemming from the loss of its previous vengeful father and the Commander's support. Dister. The young Poko leaves alone to search for the captured Maria, who was attacked by the Queen's army. The group saves the boy, but Doraemon, a robot, is captured. He is locked up and meets Maria. Thanks to the "tickling solution", he defeated the "Invincible King" in the battle in the robot arena and met his friends again. Both Doraemon and Poko set out for the Rainbow Valley and inadvertently saved Queen Jenna from the murderous plot of Dister, who has now become the new King. They and the people of the robotic kingdom attacked Dister in Rome but did not expect this to be a giant robot. Thanks to the "universal steering wheel", Nobita controlled "Robot Arena" to defeat the Robot into Drai but it turned into a rocket carrying both Doraemon and Maria, preparing to crash into the moon - a natural satellite of this planet. Thanks to the delivery machine, Doraemon reunited with his friends and mother, Poko, was reunited; they also discovered that Dister was the younger brother of Dr. Capek. Finally, the robot kingdom returned to the peaceful, happy days as before.

Production Team
Original - Fujiko F. Fujio
Screenplay - Nobuaki Kishima
Director - Tsutomu Shibayama
Major Production - Shin-Ei Animation
Distributed by - Toho

Cast

Music
Doraemon no Uta (opening theme)
Hitori janai ~I'll Be There~ by KONISHIKI and Niiyama Chiharu
Isshoni Arukou ~Walking Into Sunshine~ by KONISHIKI (ending theme)

References

External links 
 Doraemon The Movie 25th page 
 

2002 films
2002 anime films
Animated films about extraterrestrial life
Animated films about robots
Nobita and the Robot Kingdom
Films directed by Tsutomu Shibayama
Films set in Ukraine
2000s children's animated films
Japanese children's fantasy films